Estacada High School is a public high school in Estacada, Oregon, United States.

Academics 
In 2008, 69% of the school's seniors received a high school diploma. Of 200 students, 138 graduated, 48 dropped out, nine received a modified diploma, and five were still in high school as of June 2009.

References

External links 
 
 

Educational institutions established in 1905
High schools in Clackamas County, Oregon
Public high schools in Oregon
1905 establishments in Oregon